Coleophora genistae is a moth of the family Coleophoridae. It is found from Sweden to the Iberian Peninsula, Sardinia, Italy and Greece and from Great Britain to Romania. It is also known from Turkey.

Description
Adults have brownish forewings with a white costal streak. They are on wing from June to August in western Europe.

The larvae feed on petty whin (Genista anglica), Genista lobelii and  hairy greenweed (Genista pilosa). They create a lobe case, with each lobe consisting of a mined leaflet that has been sliced open at one side. The complete case strongly resembles a grass spikelet. The mouth angle is 20-40°. The leaves are blanched by the feeding. The larvae often feed gregariously. Full-grown larvae can be found in June.

References

External links
 

genistae
Moths described in 1857
Moths of Europe
Moths of Asia
Taxa named by Henry Tibbats Stainton